Wisam El Abdy is a Tunisian footballer. He currently plays for Espérance. Previously, he had moved to Espérance de Tunis from Zamalek in Egypt.

Abdi has played for the Tunisia national football team at the 2005 FIFA Confederations Cup and in qualifying matches for the 2006 FIFA World Cup.

References

External links

1979 births
Living people
Tunisian footballers
Tunisian expatriate footballers
Tunisia international footballers
2008 Africa Cup of Nations players
CS Sfaxien players
Zamalek SC players
Espérance Sportive de Tunis players
People from Sfax
Association football defenders
Egyptian Premier League players
Tunisian Ligue Professionnelle 1 players
Expatriate footballers in Egypt
Tunisian expatriate sportspeople in Egypt